Two Wives is a 2014 Philippine television drama series based on the 2009 South Korean drama series of the same title. The series was aired on ABS-CBN's Primetime Bida evening block from October 13, 2014 to March 13, 2015, replacing Sana Bukas pa ang Kahapon.

Cast and characters

Main cast
 Kaye Abad as Yvonne Aguiluz-Medrano
 Jason Abalos as Victor Guevarra
 Erich Gonzales as Janine Arguello-Celdran

Supporting cast
 Patrick Garcia as Albert Medrano
 Rayver Cruz as Dale G. del Valle
 Daniel Matsunaga as Kenjie Celdran
 CX Navarro as Marcus A. Guevarra
 Faye Alhambra as Audrey A. del Valle
 Isay Alvarez-Seña as Carmen Aguiluz
 Robert Seña as Jaime Aguilluz
 Tanya Gomez as Sonia Guevarra
 Regine Angeles as Doris Guevarra-Alcancez
 Kitkat as Mimi Olasco
 Melai Cantiveros as Carla
 Jean Saburit as Daria Alcancez
 Alex Medina as Marlon Aguiluz
 Vandolph Quizon as Gary Alcancez
 Peter Serrano as Shakira
 Paul Jake Castillo as Louie
 Sharmaine Arnaiz as Natividad "Vida" Arguello-Soler
 Carla Martinez as Rosalinda "Sandy" Gopez-del Valle
 Natasha Cabrera as Tess

Guest cast
 Dina Bonnevie as Minerva Arguello
 Yam Concepcion as Michelle Olasco
 Diane Medina as Phoebe Sales
 John Medina as Albert's friend
 Jahren Estorque as Tisoy
 John Spainhour
 Franco Daza
 Jess Mendoza as Chito
 Marissa Sanchez

See also
List of programs broadcast by ABS-CBN
List of ABS-CBN drama series

References

ABS-CBN drama series
Philippine melodrama television series
Philippine romance television series
2014 Philippine television series debuts
2015 Philippine television series endings
Philippine television series based on South Korean television series
Filipino-language television shows
Television shows set in the Philippines